Sean Woodson (born June 7, 1992) is an American mixed martial artist who competes in the Featherweight and Lightweight divisions of the Ultimate Fighting Championship.

Background
Growing up in North County, Sean Woodson’s dad was the driving inspiration behind his fighting career as his father would watch fights with his son, developing a passion for boxing. His mother had other ideas and took Sean to a trip to the pediatrician at the age of 8, asking the doctor to explain the dangers of boxing. Instead the doctor told her that with headgear, boxing is actually safer than a lot of other sports like football or hockey. Sean's mother then took him to the gym where he fell in love with the sport. Following a serious car accident at age 16, he ended up living at Matt Hughes’ Hit Squad Gym in Granite City. There, he was introduced to mixed martial arts.

Mixed martial arts career

Early career
Making his debut at RFA 44, Woodson faced Kevin Brown Jr. and went on to submit him in the first round. Competing under the banner of Shamrock FC, he would win his next four bouts,defeating Coltin Cole at Shamrock FC 283 via TKO in round one, Rashard Lovelace via unanimous decision at Shamrock FC 290, Seth Basler at Shamrock FC 295 via unanimous decision, and finally Lovelace for the second time via unanimous decision at Shamrock FC 311.

With 5 days notice and having to cut 24 pounds in that time span, Woodson appeared at Dana White's Contender Series 21, where he faced Terrance McKinney and went on to defeat him via TKO in the second round, earning a contract with the UFC.

Ultimate Fighting Championship
Woodson made his promotional debut against Kyle Bochniak on October 18, 2019 at UFC on ESPN: Reyes vs. Weidman. He won the fight via unanimous decision.

Woodson was expected to face Kyle Nelson on June 27, 2020 at UFC on ESPN: Poirier vs. Hooker. Nelson had to pull out off the bout due to visa issues, and therefore was replaced by Julian Erosa He lost the fight via D'arce choke in the third round.

Woodson was scheduled to face Jonathan Pearce on November 28, 2020 at UFC on ESPN: Smith vs. Clark. However, Woodson withdrew a week before the event due to unknown reasons and was replaced by Kai Kamaka III.

Woodson faced Youssef Zalal on June 5, 2021 at UFC Fight Night: Rozenstruik vs. Sakai. He won the bout via split decision.

Woodson faced Collin Anglin on November 13, 2021 at UFC Fight Night 197. He won the bout via TKO in round one.

Woodson faced Luis Saldaña on August 20, 2022 at UFC 278. He fought to a split draw decision.

Mixed martial arts record

|-
|Draw
|align=center|9–1–1
|Luis Saldaña
|Draw (split)
|UFC 278
|
|align=center|3
|align=center|5:00
|Salt Lake City, Utah, United States
|
|-
|Win
|align=center|9–1
|Collin Anglin
|TKO (punches to the body)
|UFC Fight Night: Holloway vs. Rodríguez
|
|align=center|1
|align=center|4:30
|Las Vegas, Nevada, United States
|
|-
|Win
|align=center|8–1
|Youssef Zalal
|Decision (split)
|UFC Fight Night: Rozenstruik vs. Sakai
|
|align=center|3
|align=center|5:00
|Las Vegas, Nevada, United States
|
|-
| Loss
| align=center|7–1
| Julian Erosa
|Submission (D'Arce choke)
|UFC on ESPN: Poirier vs. Hooker
|
|align="center"|3
|align="center"|2:44
|Las Vegas, Nevada, United States
|
|-
| Win
| align=center| 7–0
| Kyle Bochniak
|Decision (unanimous)
|UFC on ESPN: Reyes vs. Weidman 
|
|align=center|3
|align=center|5:00
|Boston, Massachusetts, United States
|
|-
| Win
| align=center| 6–0
| Terrance McKinney
| KO (flying knee)
| Dana White's Contender Series 21
| 
| align=center| 2
| align=center| 1:49
| Las Vegas, Nevada, United States
|
|-
| Win
| align=center| 5–0
| Rashard Lovelace
|  Decision (unanimous)
| Shamrock FC 311
| 
|align=center|3
|align=center|5:00
| St. Louis, Missouri, United States
| 
|-
| Win
| align=center| 4–0
| Seth Basler
| Decision (unanimous)
| Shamrock FC 295
| 
| align=center| 3
| align=center| 5:00
| St. Louis, Missouri, United States
| 
|-
| Win
| align=center| 3–0
| Rashard Lovelace
| Decision (unanimous)
| Shamrock FC 290
| 
|align=center|3
|align=center|5:00
| St. Louis, Missouri, United States
| 
|-
| Win
| align=center| 2–0
| Coltin Cole
| TKO (punches)
| Shamrock FC 283
| 
| align=center| 1
| align=center| 2:38
| St. Louis, Missouri, United States
| 
|-
| Win
| align=center| 1–0
| Kevin Brown Jr.
| Submission (guillotine choke)
| RFA 44
| 
| align=center| 1
| align=center| 1:35
|St. Charles, Missouri, United States
|

See also 
 List of current UFC fighters
 List of male mixed martial artists

References

External links 
  
 

Living people
Featherweight mixed martial artists
1992 births
American male mixed martial artists
Lightweight mixed martial artists
Mixed martial artists utilizing boxing
Ultimate Fighting Championship male fighters
American male boxers